Andrés Eloy Blanco Perez (born April 11, 1984) is a Venezuelan former professional baseball infielder. He has played in Major League Baseball (MLB) for the Kansas City Royals, Chicago Cubs, Texas Rangers, and Philadelphia Phillies.

Baseball career

Kansas City Royals
Blanco  made his major league debut with the Kansas City Royals on April 18, 2004. He hit .317 (19-for-60) with five RBIs, nine runs, two doubles, two triples, and one stolen base in 19 games.

He hit .215 with a .220 on-base percentage in 2005, and .241 with a .290 on-base percentage in 2006, both with Kansas City.  Blanco had surgery on September 29, 2006, to repair a posterior labrum tear in his left shoulder, which he injured during a swing five days prior against the Tigers.

He did not play in the major leagues in 2007, but batted .192 in the minor leagues with a .226 on-base percentage and a .212 slugging percentage.

Chicago Cubs
He signed a minor league contract with the Chicago Cubs in November 2007, played the 2008 season with the Iowa Cubs where he hit .285/.327/.336, and became a free agent at the end of the season. In December 2008, he re-signed with the Cubs.

On June 20, 2009, during an interleague game between the Cubs and Cleveland Indians, Blanco hit an RBI single to tie a game in extra innings. He later scored the winning run for the Cubs on a wild pitch thrown by Indians' closer Kerry Wood.

Blanco hit his first major league home run on July 29, 2009 while playing the Houston Astros at Wrigley Field.

Texas Rangers
On March 27, 2010, Blanco was traded to the Texas Rangers for a player to be named later or cash. He subsequently won the Rangers' utility infielder position. In 2011 he batted .224/.263/.342 for Texas. He became a free agent on November 4, 2011.

Washington Nationals
Blanco signed a minor league contract with the Washington Nationals on December 16, 2011. He also received an invitation to spring training.

Philadelphia Phillies
After leaving the Nationals, Blanco signed a minor league contract with the Philadelphia Phillies on March 31, 2012. Playing for Lehigh Valley in AAA in 2013, he batted .235/.301/.346 in 461 at bats. He had right shoulder surgery in February 2013, and missed playing the entire 2013 season.

The Phillies re-signed Blanco to a minor league deal with a spring training invitation on November 21, 2013. His contract was selected from the Lehigh Valley IronPigs on June 29, 2014.

On December 14, 2016, Blanco signed a one-year, $3 million contract with the Phillies. On June 7, 2017, Blanco pitched  of an inning in a blowout loss to the Atlanta Braves, giving up a 2-run home run for an ERA of 27.00.

San Francisco Giants
On January 30, 2018, Blanco signed a minor league contract with the San Francisco Giants. He was released on March 23.

Milwaukee Brewers
On April 2, 2018, Blanco signed a minor league contract with the Milwaukee Brewers. He elected free agency on November 2, 2018.

Atlanta Braves
On December 7, 2018, Blanco signed a minor league deal with the Atlanta Braves with an invitation to spring training. Blanco became a free agent after the season.

Second Stint with Brewers
On January 31, 2020, Blanco signed a minor league deal with the Milwaukee Brewers. He was released on May 28, 2020.

See also
 List of Major League Baseball players from Venezuela

References

External links

Andrés Blanco at SABR (Baseball BioProject)
Andrés Blanco at Pura Pelota (Venezuelan Professional Baseball League)

1984 births
Living people
Águilas del Zulia players
Arizona League Royals players
Chicago Cubs players
Gulf Coast Royals players
Gwinnett Stripers players
High Desert Mavericks players
Iowa Cubs players
Kansas City Royals players
Lehigh Valley IronPigs players
Major League Baseball players from Venezuela
Major League Baseball second basemen
Major League Baseball shortstops
Navegantes del Magallanes players
Omaha Royals players
Philadelphia Phillies players
Round Rock Express players
Baseball players from Caracas
Texas Rangers players
Venezuelan expatriate baseball players in the United States
Wichita Wranglers players
Wilmington Blue Rocks players
Colorado Springs Sky Sox players